Bruno Dugoni (30 March 1905 – 30 August 1959) was an Italian professional footballer who played as a midfielder.

Club career
Dugoni played six seasons (161 games, nine goals) in the Serie A for Modena F.C. and A.S. Roma.

International career
Dugoni made his Italy national football team debut on 4 November 1925 against Yugoslavia, and made one start for Italy in the silver winning 1931-32 Central European International Cup campaign.

Italy
 Central European International Cup: Runner-up: 1931-32

External links

 

1905 births
1959 deaths
Italian footballers
Italy international footballers
Serie A players
Modena F.C. players
A.S. Roma players
Rimini F.C. 1912 players

Association football midfielders